Juan Emanuel Lucero (born 8 June 1995) is an Argentine professional footballer who plays as a midfielder.

Career
Lucero's career started off with Vélez Sarsfield. He didn't make an appearance at senior level for the club, though was once an unused substitute for a Primera División fixture in April 2016 versus Independiente. On 12 July 2018, Lucero joined Primera B Metropolitana side Almirante Brown. His first appearance arrived in the succeeding February, as he participated in the full duration of a goalless draw at home to San Telmo.

Career statistics
.

References

External links
 

1995 births
Living people
People from La Matanza Partido
Argentine footballers
Association football midfielders
Primera B Metropolitana players
Club Atlético Vélez Sarsfield footballers
Club Almirante Brown footballers
Sportspeople from Buenos Aires Province